Pierre Latour (born 12 October 1993) is a French cyclist, who currently rides for UCI ProTeam . He is a stage winner of the Vuelta a España, and twice the winner of French National Time Trial Championships.

Career
Latour was born in Romans-sur-Isère. Due to a clerical error when he was an amateur, Latour is more commonly known with a "Roger" in his name as Pierre-Roger Latour.

AG2R La Mondiale (2015–2020)

2015 
In his first year as a professional rider, Latour first made his name in the Route du Sud. He had attacked on stage 3 but on the last climb of the day, he was joined by Alberto Contador and Nairo Quintana. He ended getting dropped on the descent by Contador who attacked. He finished the stage in 3rd position, and took 3rd overall at the end of the race, as well as winning the young rider classification.

2016 
At the Tour de Romandie, Latour won the Young rider classification which was his first in a World Tour stage race. After stage 5 at the Tour de Suisse, he was in the leaders jersey but eventually abandoned the race. He was named in the startlist for the Vuelta a España, his first Grand Tour. In this race, he achieved his first Grand Tour stage victory on the penultimate stage, beating Darwin Atapuma to the finish on the Aitana climb.

2017 
In the 2017 season, Latour once again won the Young rider classification at the Tour de Romandie. In late June he also won the French National Time Trial Championships. He was named in the startlist for the Tour de France. He had the lead in the young rider classification for 2 days before handing over the jersey to Simon Yates, who eventually ended up winning it; Latour ended 6th in the final jersey standings. He ended the year with 9th at Milano–Torino and 6th place in the Chrono des Nations.

2018 
At the Volta a Catalunya, Latour made the podium when he placed 3rd overall, and also won the Young rider classification. He also finished 8th overall at the Tour de Romandie, and 7th overall at the Critérium du Dauphiné winning the Young rider classification. In late June, Latour won the French National Time Trial Championships for the second year in succession. In July he started his second Tour de France; he already lost time on the 1st stage, but gained back time when he finished 2nd on stage 6 behind Dan Martin. He managed to take the lead in the Young rider classification after stage 10, and won the jersey outright in Paris.

Total Direct Énergie
In August 2020, Latour signed a two-year contract with the  team, from the 2021 season.

Major results

2010
 3rd Overall Tour du Valromey
2011
 1st Classique des Alpes Juniors
 2nd Road race, National Junior Road Championships
 4th Overall Regio-Tour Juniors
1st Stage 1
 5th Overall Trofeo Karlsberg
2013
 1st  Road race, Jeux de la Francophonie
 4th Piccolo Giro di Lombardia
 5th Tour du Doubs
 6th Overall Ronde de l'Isard
1st  Young rider classification
 7th Overall Tour du Gévaudan Languedoc-Roussillon
1st Young rider classification
 8th Overall Tour des Pays de Savoie
2014
 1st Grand Prix de Saint-Lyé
 1st Grand Cours-la-Ville Price
 3rd Tour du Jura
 3rd Piccolo Giro di Lombardia
 5th Overall Tour des Pays de Savoie
 6th Overall Tour de l'Avenir
 9th Overall Tour de l'Ain
2015
 3rd Overall Tour de l'Ain
1st  Young rider classification
1st Stage 4
 3rd Overall Route du Sud
1st  Young rider classification
 5th Overall Vuelta a Burgos
 7th Overall Tour of Austria
 7th Overall Étoile de Bessèges
 10th Overall Tour de Picardie
2016
 1st Stage 20 Vuelta a España
 1st  Young rider classification, Tour de Romandie
 2nd Overall Critérium International
1st  Young rider classification
 3rd Overall Tour de l'Ain
 7th Overall Étoile de Bessèges
1st  Young rider classification
 10th Giro di Lombardia
 10th Trofeo Laigueglia
2017
 1st  Time trial, National Road Championships
 1st  Young rider classification, Tour de Romandie
 3rd Tour du Finistère
 4th Overall Étoile de Bessèges
 5th Classic Sud-Ardèche
 6th Chrono des Nations
 9th Milano–Torino
 Tour de France
Held  after Stages 3–4
2018
 National Road Championships
1st  Time trial
4th Road race
 1st  Young rider classification, Tour de France
 3rd Overall Volta a Catalunya
1st  Young rider classification
 6th Chrono des Nations
 7th Overall Critérium du Dauphiné
1st  Young rider classification
 8th Overall Tour de Romandie
 8th Classic de l'Ardèche
2019
 6th Overall Tour de Pologne
 7th Giro dell'Emilia
 9th Giro di Lombardia
2020
 4th Mont Ventoux Dénivelé Challenge
2021
 3rd Overall Vuelta a Asturias
1st Stage 3
 4th Time trial, National Road Championships
 5th Overall Tour de Luxembourg
 8th Chrono des Nations
2022
 3rd Overall Tour Poitou-Charentes en Nouvelle-Aquitaine
 4th Overall Étoile de Bessèges
 4th Time trial, National Road Championships
 4th Tre Valli Varesine
 5th Overall Tour de la Provence
 6th GP Miguel Induráin
 6th Chrono des Nations
2023
 3rd Overall Étoile de Bessèges
 10th Faun-Ardèche Classic

General classification results timeline

Major championships timeline

References

External links

 
 
 
 
 

1993 births
Living people
French male cyclists
People from Romans-sur-Isère
French Vuelta a España stage winners
Sportspeople from Drôme
Cyclists from Auvergne-Rhône-Alpes